Nathalie Dechy and Meilen Tu were the defending champions but only Dechy competed that year with Émilie Loit.

Dechy and Loit lost in the semifinals to Barbara Schett and Patty Schnyder.

Schett and Schnyder won in the final 2–6, 6–2, 7–6(7–5) against Marion Bartoli and Stéphanie Cohen-Aloro.

Seeds
Champion seeds are indicated in bold text while text in italics indicates the round in which those seeds were eliminated.

 Daniela Hantuchová /  Ai Sugiyama (first round)
 Nathalie Dechy /  Émilie Loit (semifinals)
 Barbara Schett /  Patty Schnyder (champions)
 Silvia Farina Elia /  Åsa Svensson (first round)

Draw

External links
2003 Open Gaz de France Doubles Draw

Doubles
Open Gaz de France